Norwood Park station is a historic commuter railroad station along the Union Pacific Northwest Line in the Norwood Park neighborhood of Chicago, Illinois. It is officially located on 6088 North Northwest Highway, but also runs parallel to Avondale Avenue near Raven Street.

As of April 25, 2022, Norwood Park is served by 44 trains (22 in each direction) on weekdays, by 31 trains (16 inbound, 15 outbound) on Saturdays, and by 19 trains (nine inbound, 10 outbound) on Sundays.

Norwood Park station was originally built as the "Chicago and North Western Railroad Depot" in 1907. As shown on Metra's official website, the station house looks like a private residential home. In fact, the station itself is privately owned, which is one reason it opens at 5:00 A.M. and has no specific closing time.

The Norwood Park Chamber of Commerce & Industry carried out a major renovation project of the station in 1999. In 2001, it was listed on the National Register of Historic Places.

Chicago Transit Authority bus connections
 CTA
  68 Northwest Highway

References

External links

 Metra - Norwood Park
Norwood Park Station (Chicago Railfan.net)
Station from Google Maps Street View

Former Chicago and North Western Railway stations
Metra stations in Chicago
Buildings and structures on the National Register of Historic Places in Chicago
Railway stations in the United States opened in 1907
Railway stations on the National Register of Historic Places in Illinois
Bungalow architecture in Illinois